Kelly Pryce is a stand-up comedian and writer from Sacramento, California. She was a staff writer for the George Lopez talk show Lopez Tonight, and a contestant on Last Comic Standing in 2014. Her debut album, 2020's Life With a Pryce, was produced by Grammy winner Dan Schlissel for his label Stand Up! Records.

Personal life
Pryce grew up in a blue-collar neighborhood in Sacramento, the oldest of four children. Childhood dyslexia made school difficult, but she compensated by learning to make her mother and classmates laugh by impersonating her teachers.

Pryce has four children 
.

Career
Pryce began performing stand-up comedy at age 22. Sacramento magazine called her comedy "brazen and fearless" for not shying away from risqué and R-rated material while still focusing on topics such as family life and children. Pryce commented to an interviewer for Capital Public Radio that "I have a family and I talk about them in not a family-act way," joking that she wouldn't let her children listen to her act until they were over 21. She has frequently toured with Dave Attell, and cites both Attell and Rosie O’Donnell among her comedic influences.

From 2003 to 2006, she hosted a morning show on KWOD-FM in Sacramento, which ended when the station was sold and changed format.

Pryce joined Lopez Tonight in 2010, writing topical and political monologues and skits, and occasionally performing in sketches.

In 2012, she performed in New York for the stand-up series NickMom Night Out.

She appeared on Last Comic Standing in 2014, making it to the third round of the invitationals.

She appeared in the 2015 TLC series What She Said, which featured female comedians commenting on motherhood and other issues.

Discography
Life With a Pryce (Stand Up! Records, 2020)

References

External links
Kelly Pryce at Stand Up! Records website

Pryce's 2012 appearance on NickMom Night Out

Living people
People from Sacramento, California
Comedians from California
American women comedians
21st-century American comedians
American stand-up comedians
Radio personalities from California
Stand Up! Records artists
1976 births
21st-century American women